Hukumpeta is  in Alluri Sitharama Raju district of the Indian state of Andhra Pradesh. It was a census village and a rural agglomeration constituent of Araku as per 2011 census of India, which was fully included into the corporation on 18 March 2013, along with 11 panchayats.

References 

Villages in East Godavari district